Coates Kinney (November 24, 1826 – January 25, 1904) was an American lawyer, politician, journalist and poet who wrote Rain On The Roof.

Biography
Coates Kinney was born in 1826 near Penn Yan, New York. He was partly educated at Antioch College, Yellow Springs, Ohio, and was accompanied by Thomas Corwin, a former US secretary of the Treasury, while he studied law. He was admitted to the bar in Cincinnati in 1856. He became a journalist, and worked on papers in Cincinnati, Ohio, Xenia, and Springfield, Illinois.

From June 1861 until November 1865, he was a paymaster in the United States Army and was mustered out with the commission of brevet lieutenant-colonel of volunteers. He was a delegate to the convention that nominated Ulysses S. Grant for the presidency in 1868 and its Ohio secretary. He was the senator from the 5th district in the Ohio legislature 1882-1883, and delivered a speech against "The Official Rail Road Pass".

He wrote poetry, and his verses were collected in Keeuka and Other Poems (Cincinnati, 1855) and Lyrics of the Ideal and the Real (1888). Of his verses, "The Rain on the Roof", which was set to music, was the most popular. He died in Ohio in 1904. His grandson was the mountaineer Allen Carpé, who is the namesake of Mount Carpe in Alaska.

Works
Keeuka (1855)
Lyrics of the Ideal and the Real (1888)
Rain On The Roof (lyrical poem)

References

Sources

External links

 
"Poets of Ohio" (2012) from the Ohio Historical Society and the State Library of Ohio

1826 births
1904 deaths
19th-century American poets
American male poets
American male journalists
Union Army officers
Ohio lawyers
Republican Party Ohio state senators
Antioch College alumni
People of Ohio in the American Civil War
Politicians from Xenia, Ohio
19th-century American male writers
Journalists from Ohio
19th-century American politicians